Louis Bookman (also known as Buckhalter or Buchalter; 6 November 1890 – 10 June 1943) was an Irish sportsman of Lithuanian Jewish origin who represented Ireland in both football and cricket. Born the son of a rabbi in Lithuania, he arrived in Ireland in 1895 when his family emigrated to escape antisemitism; his family subsequently adopted the name Bookman.

Bookman represented numerous football clubs, moving from Belfast Celtic to English club Bradford City in 1911. Three years later he switched to West Bromwich Albion, before the First World War led him to return to Ireland to play for Glentoran and then Shelbourne. He won the County Antrim Shield with Glentoran and helped Shelbourne to a Leinster Cup and league win in 1918–19. He returned to the Football League of England to sign for Luton Town in 1919, and played over 100 games for the club before joining Port Vale in September 1923. He returned to Shelbourne the following year. He also won four caps for Ireland, and helped the Irish to claim victory in the 1914 edition of the British Home Championship.

In his cricket career, he represented the Railway Union Cricket Club, the Leinster Cricket Club, Bedfordshire, and Ireland. A left-handed batsman and left-arm spin bowler, he played in nine first-class international matches. After his career in sports was over, he worked in Ireland on the railways, and also entered the jewellery business.

Club career

Early career
Louis Bookman came on the public scene as a teenager, playing football for the Dublin Jewish team, Adelaide, (named after the large Adelaide Road synagogue). Adelaide, captained by William Woolfson (later founder and long time CEO of a prominent Irish industrial firm), were the winners of the All Ireland Under-18 Football Cup in 1908. It was from this beginning that Bookman went on to a career in professional football.

England
Bookman began his senior football career in the Irish League with Belfast Celtic, before joining English side Bradford City in 1911. He failed to establish himself as a first team regular for the "Bantams", making just 32 First League appearances in three seasons. During his time at Valley Parade, Bradford were a consistent mid-table team, finishing 11th in 1911–12, 13th in 1912–13, and ninth in 1913–14. Bookman joined league rivals West Bromwich Albion for the 1914–15 season, but found that his football career was interrupted by the outbreak of the First World War.

Return to Ireland
During the war he departed The Hawthorns and returned to Ireland to play for Glentoran and Shelbourne. The "Glens" finished second in the Belfast & District League in 1915–16, and were beaten by Linfield in the Irish Cup final; they did though lift the County Antrim Shield after a 1–0 victory over Lisburn Distillery. He then switched The Oval for Shelbourne Park, and helped the "Shels" to win both the Leinster Senior Cup and Leinster Senior League in 1918–19.

Second spell in England
After the war Bookman was bought by Luton Town for £875, where despite being over thirty, he enjoyed the most successful spell of his football career. The "Hatters" could only post a 20th-place finish in the Southern League in 1919–20, but were nevertheless elected into the Football League. Luton then finished ninth in the Third Division in 1920–21, before reaching fourth and then fifth in the Third Division South in 1921–22 and 1922–23. He left Kenilworth Road in September 1923, when he was signed by Second Division side Port Vale for a £250 fee. He lost his first team place in December that year, and was released at the end of the 1923–24 season.

Second return to Ireland
Bookman then returned to Ireland and re-signed for Shelbourne.

International career 
In 1911, while playing for Belfast Celtic, Bookman gained an Irish amateur cap. In 1914, together with Val Harris, Patrick O'Connell, Billy Gillespie and Bill Lacey, Bookman was a member of the Ireland team that won the British Home Championship. He won the first of four caps for Ireland in a 2–1 win against Wales on 1 January. He then had to wait a further seven years for more international action, as he won a further three caps in 1921: a 2–0 defeat to Scotland on 26 February, a 2–1 defeat to Wales on 9 April, and a 1–1 draw with England on 22 October.

Cricket career

Bookman played cricket for the Railway Union Cricket Club, the Leinster Cricket Club and Bedfordshire. A left-handed batsman and left-arm spin bowler, Bookman made his debut for Ireland in a first-class match against Scotland in July 1920, and went on to play for Ireland on fourteen occasions. He played in eight more first-class matches, including a match against the West Indies. His last match was against Sir Julien Cahn's XI in July 1930.

Football career statistics

Club

International

Honours
Belfast Celtic
Charity Cup runner-up: 1911

Glentoran
Irish Cup runner-up: 1916
County Antrim Shield: 1916

Shelbourne
Leinster Senior Cup: 1919
Leinster Senior League: 1918–19

Ireland
British Home Championship: 1914

See also
List of select Jewish football (association; soccer) players

References

External links
 Profile at CricketEurope Stats Zone
 

1890 births
1943 deaths
People from Žagarė
People from Shavelsky Uyezd
Lithuanian Jews
Emigrants from the Russian Empire to the United Kingdom
Irish people of Lithuanian-Jewish descent
Jewish Irish sportspeople
Association football outside forwards
Irish cricketers
Jewish cricketers
Bedfordshire cricketers
Irish association footballers (before 1923)
Pre-1950 IFA international footballers
Belfast Celtic F.C. players
Expatriate footballers in England
Bradford City A.F.C. players
West Bromwich Albion F.C. players
Glentoran F.C. players
Shelbourne F.C. players
Luton Town F.C. players
Port Vale F.C. players
League of Ireland players
NIFL Premiership players
English Football League players
Southern Football League players
Leinster Senior League (association football) players
Northern Ireland amateur international footballers